In mathematics, the supernatural numbers, sometimes called generalized natural numbers or Steinitz numbers, are a generalization of the natural numbers. They were used by Ernst Steinitz in 1910 as a part of his work on field theory.

A supernatural number  is a formal product:

 

where  runs over all prime numbers, and each  is zero, a natural number or infinity. If no  and there are only a finite number of non-zero  then we recover the positive integers. Supernatural numbers extend beyond natural numbers by allowing the possibility of infinitely many prime factors, and by allowing any given prime to divide  "infinitely often," by taking that prime's corresponding exponent to be the symbol .

Similarly, the notion of divisibility extends to the supernaturals with  if  for all . The notion of the least common multiple and greatest common divisor can also be generalized for supernatural numbers, by defining

 

and

 .

With these definitions, the gcd or lcm of infinitely many natural numbers (or supernatural numbers) is a supernatural number.
We can also extend the usual -adic order functions to supernatural numbers by defining  for each .

Supernatural numbers are used to define orders and indices of profinite groups and subgroups, in which case many of the theorems from finite group theory carry over exactly. They are used to encode the algebraic extensions of a finite field.

Supernatural numbers also arise in the classification of uniformly hyperfinite algebras.

See also
Profinite integer

References

External links
 Planet Math: Supernatural number

Number theory
Infinity